= Nigrosabulum =

Scientific classification
- Kingdom: Fungi
- Division: Ascomycota
- Class: Sordariomycetes
- Order: Hypocreales
- Family: incertae sedis
- Genus: Nigrosabulum; Malloch & Cain (1970)

Type species
- Nigrosabulum globosum Malloch & Cain (1970)

Genus of fungi

Nigrosabulum is a genus of fungi in the Hypocreales order. The relationship of this taxon to other taxa within the order is unknown (incertae sedis), and it has not yet been placed with certainty into any family.
